Pratapgarh, also called Belha or Bela Pratapgarh, is a city and  municipality in the state of Uttar Pradesh in India. It is the administrative headquarters of Pratapgarh district, part of the Allahabad division.

Etymology

Pratapgarh was the name of a fort built by Pratap Bahadur Singh (1628–1682), a local king, at Rampur. Later, the area around the fort started to be known as Pratapgarh.

In 2006, the Ministry of Panchayati Raj named Pratapgarh one of the country's 250 most backward districts (out of a total of 640). It is one of the districts of Uttar Pradesh currently receiving funds from the Backward Regions Grant Fund Programme (BRGF).

Primarily, an agragrian  district, for a while now, Pratapgarh has risen in ranks as the top producer of Aonla (Amla). The fruit grown here is sold all over India and the world in the form of sweets and medicines.

Transport

Railways
Railway is the main transport form in this district and some junctions are Pratapgarh, Chilbila and Bhupia Mau. Pratapgarh Junction railway station handles 42 trains daily.

Road 
Allahabad -Faizabad Highway (NH-96)
Lucknow Varanasi highway (NH-31)
Delhupur Raniganj Patti Akbarpur highway (SH-128)
Ganga Expressway

Attractions

Bhakti Mandir 
Bhakti Mandir is a Hindu temple established by Jagadguru Shri Kripalu Ji Maharaj. It is located in Kunda, Pratapgarh. The temple was inaugurated in November 2005. The temple features life-size deities of Shri Radha-Krishna and Shri Sita-Ram. The temple is managed by Jagadguru Kripalu Parishat.

Bakhshi Talab 
This pond is in the Raniganj tehsil of village Hussainpur, which is also known as Pakka Talab or Bakshi Talab. This pond is believed to be before the British era. It is made from cooked lime. It was built by the zamindar (Bakshi Sao). This pond is situated on the Dehlupur Raniganj main road. The water of this pond has not dried up till date and there is a deep well in the middle of the pond, which directly connects this pond with Hades. This is a very big fish in the pond.A separate bath has been made for women to bathe in this pond

Bela Devi Temple 
The Belha Devi Temple is one of the important temples, situated in Pratapgarh, on the banks of River Sai on the western side of the Allahabad-faizabad road. Here, Mother Goddess Belha or 'Belha Mai' is worshiped by devotees.

Kisan Devta Mandir 
Pratapgarh district has the world's first temple dedicated to farmers, named Kisan Devta Mandir. In this district, farmers are revered as gods. The temple was established by Shailendra Yogi, a homeopathic doctor, in Sarai Mahesh village of Patti tehsil of Pratapgarh in 2015. The six feet tall idol made of sandstone and holding a plough is accompanied by an idol of Kisan Devi.

Notable people

Gallery

References

External links
Pratapgarh District Website

Pratapgarh News Website